Richard Godfrey Rivers (1858 – 4 February 1925), generally known as R. Godfrey Rivers, was an English artist, active in Australia and president of the Queensland Art Society from 1892–1901 and 1904–08.

Early life

Richard Godfrey Rivers was born in 1858 in Plymouth, England,  the son of Richard Rivers and Bertha (née Harris). His older brother was Arthur Richard Rivers, an Anglican priest in Australia.

Rivers studied at the Slade School of Art (1877–83) in London under Professor Alphonse Legros. He won a landscape painting prize there in 1883 and exhibited at the Royal Academy in 1884.

Artistic career
[[File:Street in Old Sydney, by Richard Godfrey Rivers, 1889.JPG|thumb|Street in Old Sydney''', by Richard Godfrey Rivers, 1889]]

Rivers emigrated to Australia in 1889 and taught at Katoomba College (along with Phil May). Rivers was second art master at Brisbane Central Technical College from 1890 to 1915; and was president of the Queensland Art Society from 1892–1901 and 1904–08. He was also honorary curator of the Queensland National Art Gallery from 1895 to 1914.

On 25 Sept 1901, Richard Godfrey Rivers married Selina Jane (née Bell) at St John's Cathedral, Brisbane, the ceremony being conducted by his brother Arthur. The couple had a son (also named Richard Godfrey) in 1907 but he died in 1912 and was buried in Toowong Cemetery.

In 1903, Rivers painted a picture Under the Jacaranda'', which has been described as "quintessentially Brisbane". The painting of Rivers and his wife Selina taking tea beside the Brisbane Central Technical College under the shade of Australia's first Jacaranda tree planted in the Brisbane Botanic Gardens by the garden's first curator Walter Hill. The woman in the painting is often described as his future wife Miss Selina Bell, despite the couple marrying in 1901, although it is possible that an earlier version of the work preceded their marriage. The painting is part of the collection of the Queensland Art Gallery.

Rivers established a local reputation as a portrait painter, and portraits by him of Sir Samuel Griffith and others hang in the supreme court at Brisbane. He also taught at the Brisbane High School for Girls and at Brisbane Girls Grammar School. He moved to Hobart, Tasmania in 1915 and tried to raise interest in the Hobart gallery.

Later life

Rivers died of typhoid fever in London, England on 4 February 1925. He was cremated in London and his ashes buried in his son's grave in Toowong Cemetery, Brisbane. A memorial service was held for him in St John's Cathedral in Brisbane. His wife Selina died in 1948 in Hobart, Tasmania. She was cremated there and her ashes were also buried in their son's grave in Toowong Cemetery.

Legacy

Examples of Rivers' outdoor work are in the state galleries at Sydney and Brisbane.

His wife Selina founded the Godfrey Rivers Trust. On alternating years, the trust would purchase an overseas art work or provide a prize for local artists.

References

External links
Rivers Richard Godfrey — Brisbane City Council Grave Location Search

1859 births
1925 deaths
19th-century English painters
English male painters
20th-century English painters
Australian painters
Burials at Toowong Cemetery
Alumni of the Slade School of Fine Art
20th-century English male artists
19th-century English male artists
Artists from Brisbane
English emigrants to colonial Australia
Artists from Plymouth, Devon